Rasfand (also Romanized as Rāsfand; also known as Rāsvand and Rāswand) is a village in Howmeh-ye Gharbi Rural District, in the Central District of Izeh County, Khuzestan Province, Iran. At the 2006 census, its population was 1,135, in 189 families.

References 

Populated places in Izeh County